The orphan salamander (Bolitoglossa capitana) is a species of salamander in the family Plethodontidae. Its natural habitat is subtropical or tropical moist montane forests. It is threatened by habitat loss.

References 

capitana
Amphibians of Colombia
Endemic fauna of Colombia
Amphibians of the Andes
Taxonomy articles created by Polbot
Amphibians described in 1963